, sometimes simply referred to either as , or The Karate Tournament, is a 1992 karate-based fighting arcade game developed and published by Mitchell Corporation.  It was released exclusively as an arcade game on December 1, 1992.

References

External links
Chatan Yarakuu Shanku - The Karate Tournament at The Large Cult Fighting Game March 
Chatan Yarakuu Shanku - The Karate Tournament at Fighters Front Line 

Chatan Yarakuu Shanku - The Karate Tournament at arcade-history

1992 video games
Arcade video games
Arcade-only video games
Mitchell Corporation games
Fighting games
Karate video games
Multiplayer video games
Video games developed in Japan